Bruce Basso joined the Mario L. Basso Agency founded by his father in 1970. Under his leadership, the firm grew to become one of the more prominent agencies in the Bay Area of San Francisco, California. In 1990, the Mario L. Basso Agency merged with Albuger de Grosz to form ABD Insurance & Financial, the 14th largest insurance brokerage in the United States.

Early life
Born in San Francisco, Basso was raised in San Mateo. He served in the US Navy during Vietnam and earned a bachelor's degree in business from San Francisco State University soon thereafter in 1972. Basso has since attended continuous executive programs from the Wharton School of Business, Stanford University, and the University of California at Berkeley.

Public service
Basso is a member of various boards and committees, including various Insurance Carrier President's Advisory Councils; the Board of Directors World Broker Federation, Washington, D.C.; the Board of Directors of Copaprose/Latin America; Board of Directors, Council of Insurance Agents & Brokers of Washington DC; the California Department of Insurance Advisory Board; and the Executive Committee of the World Broker Network. Basso also serves as current National Board Chairman of The Insurance Industry Charitable Foundation.

Acquisition by Wells Fargo
In 2007, ABD Insurance & Financial was acquired by Wells Fargo Bank, through the acquisition of Greater Bay Bancorp. 

In July 2008, Basso was appointed Co-President of Wells Fargo's Global Broker Network, LLC. The network has 10,000 insurance and risk management professionals serving customers from 330 offices across 70 countries, and provides insurance brokerage services in 115 countries.

Personal life
Basso currently resides in Atherton, California with his wife and two children.

References 

San Francisco State University alumni
Wharton School of the University of Pennsylvania alumni
Stanford University alumni
University of California, Berkeley alumni
Living people
Year of birth missing (living people)
People from San Mateo, California
People from Atherton, California